Yes Colombia (Sí Colombia) is a centrist political party in Colombia. It was founded by Noemí Sanín (a dissident of Conservative Party). 
At the legislative elections in 10 March 2002, the party won as one of the many small parties' parliamentary representation. 

Political parties in Colombia